This is a list of awards and nominations received by Filipino folk pop/pop rock band Ben&Ben. As of January 2023, the band has released two studio albums, one EP, 31 singles, five promotional singles, and one charity single.Their studio albums Limasawa Street and Pebble House, Vol. 1: Kuwaderno won them many awards and nominations, including Favorite Album of the Year Award for both albums from Awit Awards.

The band were also recognized as a group by various award giving bodies including NME Awards, BaiCon Infest Spotlight Awards, and Wish Music Awards.

As of January 2023, Ben&Ben has been nominated for 71 awards, winning 32.

Awards and nominations

Notes

References

Lists of awards received by Filipino musician
Lists of awards received by musical group